Aldo Nicodemi (1919–1963) was an Italian film actor.

Filmography

References

External links

1919 births
1963 deaths
Italian male film actors
People from Lazio